"Everybody's Changing" is a song performed by English alternative rock band Keane. It was released as the second single from their debut studio album, Hopes and Fears (2004). After a single release on Fierce Panda in May 2003, which peaked at number 122 in the UK Singles Chart, it was re-released on Island on 3 May 2004 after the success of "Somewhere Only We Know" and reached number four. It is also used in the TV series, In Plain Sight and can also be heard in the final moments of One Tree Hill episode "Truth Doesn't Make a Noise" and Scrubs episode "My Day at the Races".

In August 2006, the song was rated No. 79 from the top 100 greatest songs of all time by The Sun. That same year, English singer Lily Allen recorded a cover of the song, released on her single "Littlest Things" (a version later appeared on the 2007 compilation album, The Saturday Sessions: The Dermot O'Leary Show).

Composition and recording
"Everybody's Changing" was composed in 2001 by Tim Rice-Oxley, just after guitarist Dominic Scott had left the band.

Recording took place at the Helioscentric Studios, Rye, East Sussex. The version appearing on the Fierce Panda release was a home-recorded song, supposedly recorded in a single room.

"Everybody's Changing" uses similar instrumentation as is used throughout Hopes and Fears.
The style of "Everybody's Changing" has been described as "piano rock", a style of rock in which the piano is the main instrument instead of the guitar. Throughout the song, a synthesizer is played in the background.

Meaning

Fierce Panda single
The Fierce Panda release of "Everybody's Changing" was both Keane's first commercial release, and their first release after the departure of guitarist Dominic Scott.

The release arose as a result of Simon Williams attending a Keane gig at London's Betsey Trotwood in December 2002, and liking what he heard so much that he immediately offered to put out a single for the band.

Legend has it that when recording the song for this release, the band recorded it in a back room of the house of Tim Rice-Oxley's parents, on borrowed equipment – which broke, thus meaning the band had to go to another house in order to mix it.

It went on to be selected by Steve Lamacq as his single of the week on Radio 1 on 19 April 2003. This in large part led to the bidding war surrounding the band that led to them being signed to Island.

The CD single was released on 12 May 2003. During the first week 733 copies of the 1500 released were sold, reaching No. 122 in the UK Singles Chart. However, this release was so limited that nowadays copies can be expected to sell on eBay in the region of £90.

The cover art, designed by Alex Lake, represents Tom Chaplin's shadow filled with the photography of two boats. The typeface used in the cover is different from that used in both the Hopes and Fears and the Under the Iron Sea publicity campaigns.

Island single

The 2004 version of "Everybody's Changing", re-recorded during the Heliocentric sessions of winter 2003, is Keane's second major-label release during the Hopes and Fears campaign.

The single was released on 3 May 2004, a week before the album, and it reached number four on the UK Singles Chart, selling about 25,000 copies. The song also reached the top 10 in Denmark, France and Italy; it is the band's highest-charting song in all three countries. There were also pocket CDs with two songs and polyphonic ringtones, as well as alternative versions for France, the Netherlands and Germany.

The enhanced CD includes the UK videoclip and wallpapers. This single was only released in Europe and Australia.

Music videos
There are three videos for this song.

International version
Keane are playing in a white room, and proceed to change into other persons. Most of the persons they change into are easily recognizable archetypes from cultures around the world. These include a basketball player, a Japanese geisha, a military soldier, a doctor in a white lab coat, a female bodybuilder, a young female gymnast, an Aboriginal Australian tribesman, a British police woman, a Boy Scout, an Inuit man, a Ballet dancer and a homeless man.

United States version
Keane appear on a scene representing a sunset – their performance is broken up with clips of gigs in London, Mexico City and United States.

Unreleased version
This video was directed by Mark Pellington, but was shelved after the band apparently (according to rumour) decided it didn't fit with the tone of the song. This video has since been released and has gained some popularity on the internet.

Running at seven minutes long, the video is in the style of "verbatim theatre", with people talking directly to camera. It primarily focuses on people retelling their experiences of losing a loved one – including Pellington, who discusses losing his wife, and how the song helped him cope with his loss.  During the course of the song, we then witness the people who have retold their stories, remembering their experiences while apparently listening to the song.

Track listings

B-sides

"Bedshaped"

Originally appeared on Fierce Panda release only. See "Bedshaped" main page for composition details.

"The Way You Want It"
An acoustic piano track that appears only on the Fierce Panda single. It also appears on Strangers, though is not credited. It was played live during late 2003

"Fly to Me"
Widely considered a fan favourite, but to date has never fully been played live. The chorus has been performed during some shows of the 2007 Under The Iron Sea arena tour, with the arena name put into it.

The song was first recorded as a quick demo including a solo of a melodica Tim Rice-Oxley bought in Vienna when Keane were supporting Starsailor. The demo included a simple drum pattern and Rice-Oxley providing both lead and backing vocals. At that time, the lyrics did not yet include the second verse (As much as I want you [...] you need a friend) of the eventual version. Instead, the first verse was repeated.

When the band decided to use the song as a B-side for Everybody's Changing, they went into the old Island Studios in St Peter's Square to record vocals and real drums. For some reason Steve Winwood's Hammond organ was in the studio, deciding the band to add this instrument to the track too. Because the allotted studio time was rapidly running out, Rice-Oxley had to hurry finishing the lyrics. With hardly any time left, all the rough vocals and backing vocals from the demo were added to double-track Tom Chaplin's vocal in the choruses, creating a haunting vocal sound. According to Rice-Oxley, this specific sound is "one of the things that makes the song so atmospheric and moving".

During an interview for a fanzine, Margaret Rice-Oxley (Tim's mother) is quoted as saying that she and Tim's father cried the first time they heard this song.

Official sheet music for this song is available in the Wise Publication book of Hopes and Fears.

"To the End of the Earth"
Composed by Tim Rice-Oxley and Dominic Scott in 2000.  The song was originally composed on guitar, and a regular feature of live gigs before Scott's departure. This version was posted by the band on their website in early 2001 so fans could hear it – this version is still in circulation on the net.

After Scott's departure, Rice-Oxley recomposed the song for the piano.  It was re-recorded for the CD single.  It is one of only three songs from the pre-Hopes and Fears era to survive the transition from the "guitar" Keane to "piano" Keane – the other songs being "She Has No Time" and "Allemande".

Soundtrack usage
This song was featured in the NBC sitcom Scrubs in the fifth-season episode "My Day at the Races." It was also used in Flight 29 Down in "See Ya." An instrumental version of it was used as background music for a Telekom Malaysia advertisement announcing its rebranding as 'TM' in 2005.  The song was also used in the promos for the second season of In Plain Sight.
The song was featured in the second-season episode "Truth Doesn't Make a Noise" of the TV series One Tree Hill and also appears on its first soundtrack, One Tree Hill – Music from the WB Television Series, Vol. 1.

On 13 April 2010, at the launch of the United Kingdom's Conservative Party election manifesto, the song was used by the party despite not having sought permission from the band for its use. Band member Richard Hughes later stated on Twitter that he was "horrified" to hear the song being played, and said he would not vote for them.

Charts and certifications

Weekly charts

Year-end charts

Certifications

Release history

Notes

External links
Official site
Keaneshaped – Information about record (Fierce Panda)
Keaneshaped – Information about record (Island)
Keane.fr – Information about record in French (Island)
Keane.fr – Information about record in French (Fierce Panda)

2003 songs
2003 singles
2004 singles
Fierce Panda Records singles
Interscope Records singles
Island Records singles
Lily Allen songs
Keane (band) songs
Songs written by Tim Rice-Oxley
Songs written by Tom Chaplin
Songs written by Richard Hughes (musician)
Music videos directed by Mark Pellington
Number-one singles in Romania